March 30 - Eastern Orthodox liturgical calendar - April 1

All fixed commemorations below are observed on April 13 by Orthodox Churches on the Old Calendar.

For March 31st, Orthodox Churches on the Old Calendar commemorate the Saints listed on March 18.

Saints

 Righteous Joseph the Fair (the All-Comely), son of Jacob, Patriarch (c. 1700 BC)
 Saint Acacius the Confessor, Bishop of Melitene in Pisidia (251)
 Saint Hypatius the Wonderworker, Bishop of Gangra (326)
 Theophilos the Martyr, and those with him, in Crete. 
 Martyrs Menander and Sabinus, and another 38 martyrs, in Hermopolis of Egypt, under Julian the Apostate (c. 361-363)
 Saint Apollonius (Apollo) of the Thebaid, ascetic (4th century)
 Hieromartyrs Abdas, Bishop of Hormizd-Ardashir, and the Deacon Benjamin, of Persia (c. 424)  (see also: May 16 and March 12)
 Saint Hypatius, Abbot of Rufinus in Chalcedon (446)
 Venerable Blaise of Amorium and Mount Athos (c. 909) 
 Venerable Stephen the Wonderworker, ascetic.

Pre-Schism Western saints

 Saint Balbina of Rome (c. 130)
 Martyrs Theodulus, Anesius, Felix, Cornelia and Companions, in North Africa.
 Saint Renovatus, Abbot of Cauliana in Lusitania, then Bishop of Merida in Spain for twenty-two years (c. 633)
 Saint Aldo, Abbot of Hasnon Abbey (fr) in Belgium (8th century)
 Saint Guy (Guido) (1046)

Post-Schism Orthodox saints

 Saint Hypatius the Healer, of the Kiev Caves (14th century)
 Saint Ivan I of Moscow (John I Daniilovich Kalita), Prince of Moscow from 1325 and Grand Prince of Vladimir from 1328 (1340)  
 Saint Jonah, Metropolitan of Kiev, Moscow, and all Russia (1461)
 Saint Philaret, Abbot of Glinsk Hermitage (1841)
 Saint Innocent, Metropolitan of Moscow, Enlightener of Siberia and Alaska (1879)

New martyrs and confessors

 New Hieromartyr John Blyumovich, Priest (1938)

Other commemorations

 Appearance of the Iveron Icon of the Most Holy Theotokos, on Mt. Athos ("Panagia Portaitissa" or "Gate-Keeper") (late 10th century)  (see also: February 12)
 Repose of Archbishop Averky (Taushev) of Syracuse and Holy Trinity Monastery (1976)
 Repose of Schemanun Anastasia (Shevelenko) of Karaganda (1977)
 Repose of Archimandrite Thaddeus (Strabulovich) of Vitovnica Monastery (Tadej Štrbulović), Serbia (2003)

Icon gallery

Notes

References

Sources
 March 31/April 13. Orthodox Calendar (PRAVOSLAVIE.RU).
 April 13 / March 31. HOLY TRINITY RUSSIAN ORTHODOX CHURCH (A parish of the Patriarchate of Moscow).
 March 31. OCA - The Lives of the Saints.
 The Autonomous Orthodox Metropolia of Western Europe and the Americas (ROCOR). St. Hilarion Calendar of Saints for the year of our Lord 2004. St. Hilarion Press (Austin, TX). p. 25.
 March 31. Latin Saints of the Orthodox Patriarchate of Rome.
 The Roman Martyrology. Transl. by the Archbishop of Baltimore. Last Edition, According to the Copy Printed at Rome in 1914. Revised Edition, with the Imprimatur of His Eminence Cardinal Gibbons. Baltimore: John Murphy Company, 1916. pp. 91-92.
Greek Sources
 Great Synaxaristes:  31 ΜΑΡΤΙΟΥ. ΜΕΓΑΣ ΣΥΝΑΞΑΡΙΣΤΗΣ.
  Συναξαριστής. 31 Μαρτίου. ECCLESIA.GR. (H ΕΚΚΛΗΣΙΑ ΤΗΣ ΕΛΛΑΔΟΣ). 
Russian Sources
  April 13 (March 31). Православная Энциклопедия под редакцией Патриарха Московского и всея Руси Кирилла (электронная версия). (Orthodox Encyclopedia - Pravenc.ru).
  31 марта (ст.ст.) 13 апреля 2013 (нов. ст.). Русская Православная Церковь Отдел внешних церковных связей. (DECR).

March in the Eastern Orthodox calendar